Krzysztof Janczak (born 12 November 1974) is a Polish volleyball player. He competed in the men's tournament at the 1996 Summer Olympics.

References

1974 births
Living people
Polish men's volleyball players
Olympic volleyball players of Poland
Volleyball players at the 1996 Summer Olympics
People from Wałbrzych
Gwardia Wrocław players
Gwardia Wrocław coaches